Johan Johnsson may refer to:
Johan Johnsson (ice hockey) (born 1993), Swedish ice hockey player
Johan Johnsson (footballer), Swedish footballer